The German Trade Union Confederation (DGB) is an umbrella organisation (sometimes known as a national trade union center) for eight German trade unions, in total representing more than 6 million people (31 December 2011). It was founded in Munich, 12 October 1949.

The DGB coordinates joint demands and activities within the German trade union movement. It represents the member unions in contact with the government authorities, the political parties and the employers' organisations. However, the umbrella organisation is not directly involved in collective bargaining and does not conclude collective labour agreements.

Union delegates elect committees for 9 districts, 66 regions and the federal centre. The organisation holds a federal congress every four years. This assembly sets the framework for trade union policies and elects five Federal Executives. Together with the presidents of the member unions they constitute the DGB's executive committee. The members of the executive committee, together with the DGB regional presidents and 70 delegates from the unions, form a Federal Council which meets once a year to make decisions on national issues. The DGB also has a youth organisation, DGB-Jugend.

The DGB has its headquarters in Berlin. It is a member of the European Trade Union Confederation (ETUC) and the International Trade Union Confederation (ITUC).

History

Until 1933 

As first German confederation of unions at 14 March 1892 the Generalkommission der Gewerkschaften Deutschlands was founded in Halberstadt. It represented 57 national and some local unions with approximate 300,000 people in total. After World War I unions had to reorganise. During a congress in Nuremberg from 30 June until 5 July 1919 the Allgemeiner Deutscher Gewerkschaftsbund (ADGB) was founded as an umbrella organisation of 52 unions with more than 3 million members. The ADGB may be seen as predecessor of today's DGB. Like today, there also existed a conservative counterpart of lesser importance.
Curiously, this conservative organisation was named Deutscher Gewerkschaftsbund, DGB. On 2 May 1933 all trade unions were dissolved by the Nazis.

1946–1949 
After World War II German unions had to reorganize once again. Various regional and issue-specific unions formed under the Western occupations of Germany.

On 9–11 February 1946 the Freier Deutscher Gewerkschaftsbund (FDGB) was founded in Berlin as a confederation of 15 unions in the Soviet occupation zone.

On 23–25 April 1947 the Deutscher Gewerkschaftsbund, DGB was founded in Bielefeld as a confederation of 12 unions in the Allied-occupied Germany.

Foundations in the American occupation zone:
24/25 August 1946: Freier Gewerkschaftsbund Hessen
30 August – 1 September 1946: Gewerkschaftsbund Württemberg-Baden
27–29 March 1947: Bayerischer Gewerkschaftsbund

Foundations in the French occupation zone:
15/16 February 1947: Gewerkschaftsbund Süd-Württemberg und Hohenzollern
1/2 March 1947: Badischer Gewerkschaftsbund
2 May 1947: Allgemeiner Gewerkschaftsbund Rheinland-Pfalz

On 12–14 October, the 7 umbrella organisation in West Germany merged into the West German DGB as a confederation of 16 single trade unions.

Reunification – Present 
In 1990, the members of the FDGB of the German Democratic Republic joined the members of the DGB. In recent years, many member unions of the DGB have merged, so today the DGB has only 8 members. This was seen as a progress by many unionists who hoped for stronger representation, while others claim that strong member unions like ver.di with its two million members have considerably weakened the DGB as a roof organization.

In general, the influence of German trade unions has declined since 1990 and had to accept shrinking real incomes and a reform of the welfare system in 2004 ("Hartz IV laws"), which put additional pressure on wages. For some years, the DGB and its member unions have been campaigning for a minimum wage to be introduced in Germany. Well into the 1990s, they had rejected this idea because they got better results from their strong position in the German system of collective bargaining.

Affiliates

Today

Former affiliates

Other unions 

In 1978 the Gewerkschaft der Polizei (GdP, see above) joined the DGB as 17th union.

The Deutsche Angestellten Gewerkschaft – DAG – was a large white collar trade union. Although the DAG in the British zone 1946 was a member of the DGB in the British zone, the West German DAG never joined the West German DGB as a single member union. In 2001 the DAG merged with four existing DGB unions to become the new DGB union Ver.di.

The railway union Verkehrsgewerkschaft GDBA was a member of the other labour federation, the German Civil Service Federation. In 2010 the GDBA merged with existing DGB union TRANSNET to form the new DGB union EVG.

Presidents
1949: Hans Böckler
1951: Christian Fette
1952: Walter Freitag
1956: Willi Richter
1962: Ludwig Rosenberg
1969: Heinz Oskar Vetter
1982: Ernst Breit
1990: Heinz-Werner Meyer
1994: Dieter Schulte
2002: Michael Sommer
2014: Reiner Hoffmann

Structure

districts with regions 
 Baden-Württemberg: 4 regions
 Bayern: 14 regions
 Berlin/Brandenburg: 4 regions
 Hessen/Thüringen: 6 regions
 Niedersachsen/Bremen/Sachsen-Anhalt: 10 regions
 Nord (Niedersachsen/Bremen/Sachsen-Anhalt): 7 regions
 Nordrhein-Westfalen: 11 regions
 Sachsen: 4 regions
 West (Rheinland-Pfalz/Saarland): 6 regions

See also 

List of labor unions
Hans Böckler - first president of the confederation

Literature 

 F.Deppe/G.Fülberth/H.J.Harrer: Geschichte der deutschen Gewerkschaftsbewegung 
 http://www.dgb.de/uber-uns/dgb-heute/

External links 

 Official site in German
 Official site in English

References 

 
National trade union centers of Germany
Organisations based in Berlin
1949 establishments in West Germany
Trade unions established in 1949